Pritchard Provincial Park is a provincial park in British Columbia, Canada, located on the north side of the South Thompson River between the communities of Monte Creek (W) and Chase (E).
The Park is actually split into two sections. The best access to the actual Park is from the water; as you would need Private Land owners permission to access from the land. The area in between the Park's boundaries is supposedly under the Province of British Columbia's jurisdiction, but is not part of the Provincial Park itself.

External links

Provincial parks of British Columbia
1997 establishments in British Columbia
Protected areas established in 1997